Pope Urban V (1362–1370) thirteen new cardinals in four consistories.

18 September 1366
 Angelic de Grimoard, C.R.S.A., brother of the Pope, bishop of Avignon – cardinal-priest of San Pietro in Vincoli, then cardinal-bishop of Albano (17 September 1367), † 13 April 1388
 Guillaume de la Sudrie, O.P., bishop of Marseille – cardinal-priest of SS. Giovanni e Paolo (received the title on 27 września 1366), then cardinal-bishop of Ostia e Velletri (17 September 1367), † 18 April 1373.
 Marco da Viterbo, O.F.M., master general of the Order of Friars Minor – cardinal-priest of Santa Prassede (received the title on 14 December 1367), † 4 September 1369.

12 May 1367
 Guillaume d'Aigrefeuille, O.S.B.Clun. – cardinal-priest of S. Stefano al Monte Celio, † 13 January 1401

22 September 1368
 Philippe de Cabassole, patriarch of Jerusalem – cardinal-priest of SS. Marcellino e Pietro (received the title on 4 June 1369), then cardinal-bishop of Sabina (31 May 1370), † 27 August 1372.
 Simon Langham, O.S.B., archbishop of Canterbury – cardinal-priest of S. Sisto (received the title on 24 May 1369), then cardinal-bishop of Palestrina (August 1373), † 22 July 1376.
 Bernard du Bosquet, archbishop of Naples – cardinal-priest of SS. XII Apostoli (received the title on 31 October 1368), † 19 April 1371.
 Jean de Dormans, bishop of Beauvais – cardinal-priest of SS. IV Coronati (received the title in 1371), † 7 November 1373.
 Étienne de Poissy, bishop of Paris – cardinal-priest of S. Eusebio (received the title on 13 February 1369), † 17 October 1373.
 Pierre de Banac, bishop of Castres – cardinal-priest of S. Lorenzo in Damaso, † 7 October 1369.
 Francesco Tebaldeschi – cardinal-priest of S. Sabina (received the title on 20 October 1368), † 6 September 1378.

Urban V intended also to elevate to the cardinalate patriarch of Alexandria Arnaud Bernard du Pouget, but this nomination did not take effect due to the sudden death of the patriarch.

7 June 1370
 Pierre d'Estaing, O.S.B., archbishop of Bourges – cardinal-priest of S. Maria in Trastevere (received the title on 28 June 1370), then cardinal-bishop of Ostia e Velletri (28 September 1373), † 25 November 1377.
 Pietro Corsini, bishop of Florence – cardinal-priest of S. Lorenzo in Damaso, then cardinal-bishop of Porto e S. Rufina (1374), † 16 August 1405

References

Sources 
Konrad Eubel: Hierarchia Catholica, I, 1913
G. Mollat, E. Blauze: Vitae paparum avenionensium, I-II, Paris, 1914-1928

Urban V
College of Cardinals
Pope Urban V
 Ur